Sir Andrew Linton  (28 November 1893 – 9 January 1971) was a New Zealand cheesemaker, farmer and New Zealand Dairy Board administrator. He was born in Mataura, New Zealand, on 28 November 1893.

In the 1953 Coronation Honours, Linton was appointed a Commander of the Order of the British Empire. He was promoted to Knight Commander of the Order of the British Empire in the 1964 New Year Honours.

See also

 List of cheesemakers

References

1893 births
1971 deaths
New Zealand farmers
People from Mataura
Cheesemakers
New Zealand Knights Commander of the Order of the British Empire